Horowitz is a Yiddish surname.

Horowitz may also refer to:
 Horowitz family
Hořovice, Bohemia (German: Horschowitz or Horowitz)
 Horowitz (crater), on Mars
 Horowitz index, used in medical diagnostics

See also 
Hirschowitz (surname)